Matters of the Heart is Bob Bennett's second release.

Release history 

Matters of the Heart was released by CBS/Priority in 1982. The album went out of print mid-year when the label ceased operations. In 1985, Star Song re-released the album and went out-of-print by 1987. Urgent Records re-released a cassette version in 1989 and the CD in 1990 in May 2007 it was released digitally at the iTunes Store.

In January 1983, CCM Magazine named it "Album of the Year - 1982", beating Amy Grant's Age to Age. It was later named it as one of the "Top 20 Christian Albums of All Time", and listed at No. 65 in the book CCM Presents: The 100 Greatest Albums in Christian Music.

Track listing 

All songs written by Bob Bennett, except where noted.
 "Matters of the Heart" – 3:30
 "Falling Stars" – 3:05
 "Mountain Cathedral" – 4:54
 "1951" (Jim Fowler/Michael Aguilar/Bob Bennett) – 3:06
 "A Song About Baseball" – 3:20
 "Madness Dancing" – 3:16
 "Together All Alone" – 2:47
 "Beggar" – 3:55
 "Come and See" (Bob Bennett/Michael Aguilar) – 2:51
 "Heart of the Matter" – 6:11

Personnel 

 Bob Bennett – acoustic guitar, vocals, composer
 Steve Swinford – acoustic guitar (track 3)
 Hadley Hockensmith – electric guitar
 Don Gerber – banjo
 Mark Davis – hammer dulcimer
 John Patitucci – acoustic and electric bass
 Keith Edwards – drums
 John Ferraro – drums
 Alex MacDougall – percussion
 Roby Duke – background vocals
 Kelly Willard – background vocals
 Jonathan David Brown – producer, recording, mixing
 Smitty Price – keyboards, charts, track arrangements

References

Bob Bennett (singer-songwriter) albums
1982 albums